Triclonella platyxantha is a moth in the family Cosmopterigidae. It is found in Central and South America.

References

Natural History Museum Lepidoptera generic names catalog

Cosmopteriginae
Moths of Central America
Moths of South America
Moths described in 1909